James Edward Barnett (June 9, 1924 – September 18, 2004) was an American professional wrestling promoter, and one of the owners of the Indianapolis National Wrestling Alliance promotion, Australia's World Championship Wrestling and Georgia Championship Wrestling. He also served as a federal officeholder during the Presidency of Jimmy Carter.

Professional wrestling career
Barnett was born in Oklahoma City, Oklahoma. He attended the University of Chicago in the 1940s. In 1949, he went to work for Fred Kohler's wrestling magazine "Wrestling as You Like It" in Chicago. He eventually became involved in the operations of Kohler's wrestling promotion. In 1955, Barnett became a part-owner (with Kohler) of the National Wrestling Alliance promotion in Indianapolis. He moved to Indianapolis. In 1958, he entered into a partnership with wrestling promoter Johnny Doyle and started to run wrestling shows on a national basis in cities including Detroit, Denver and Los Angeles, sometimes cooperating with NWA territorial promotions and sometimes operating in competition with the local NWA promotion (Detroit).

The book, The Thin Thirty, by Shannon Ragland, chronicles actor Rock Hudson's involvement in a 1962 sex scandal at the University of Kentucky involving the football team. Ragland writes that Jim Barnett, a wrestling promoter, engaged in prostitution with members of the team, and that Hudson was one of Barnett's customers.

In 1964, Barnett traveled to Sydney in Australia with Johnny Doyle to inspect the Australian wrestling scene. Selling his Indianapolis and Detroit promotions, he returned to Australia with Doyle under the banner of World Championship Wrestling, presenting their first card on 23 October 1964, at the Sydney Stadium, and continued until 1974 when Barnett sold the promotion to Tony Kolonie and returned to the United States.

In 1974, Barnett became one of the owners of Georgia Championship Wrestling. Tommy Rich's less-than-a-week NWA World Heavyweight Championship reign was one of Barnett's attempts to boost Georgia gates. In addition to his role in wrestling, it has also been acknowledged that Barnett served on Georgia U.S. President Jimmy Carter's Presidential Counsel and was appointed as a member of the National Endowment for the Arts in April 1980. In 1984, Barnett sold his share of Georgia Championship Wrestling to the World Wrestling Federation leading to what was known as Black Saturday. He was sued by wrestler, booker and partial owner of Georgia Championship Wrestling Ole Anderson in the aftermath of the sale.

Barnett served as a vice president of Titan Sports (WWF) from 1984 to 1987. While with the WWF, he negotiated the sale of the TBS wrestling timeslot from the WWF to Jim Crockett Promotions.

In 1987 and 1988, he worked for Jim Crockett Promotions. When Jim Crockett sold his promotion to Ted Turner's company in November 1988, he went to work for World Championship Wrestling as a senior adviser. He left WCW in 2001. He became a consultant for World Wrestling Entertainment in 2002.

Barnett died of pneumonia on September 18, 2004, at the age of 80. He had recently developed cancer and broken his arm in a fall.

Awards and accomplishments
National Wrestling Alliance
NWA Hall of Fame (2005)
Wrestling Observer Newsletter
Wrestling Observer Newsletter Hall of Fame (Class of 1996)
WWE
WWE Hall of Fame (Class of 2019)

See also
List of professional wrestling promoters

References

External links
 Cauliflower Alley Club obituary
 Jim Barnett Media Man profile
 Slam Wrestling: Jim Barnett was TV innovator
 Slam Wrestling: Jim Barnett's Australian legacy
 Jim Barnett's wrestling history at Legacyofwrestling.com

1924 births
2004 deaths
Deaths from pneumonia in the United States
American sports businesspeople
Gay sportsmen
LGBT professional wrestlers
American LGBT sportspeople
Businesspeople from Oklahoma City
Professional wrestling promoters
WWE executives
WWE Hall of Fame Legacy inductees
20th-century American businesspeople
20th-century American LGBT people